Rise (stylized as RISE) is the second studio album by South Korean singer Taeyang, member of the K-pop group Big Bang. It is his first album in four years since Solar in 2010. Rise became the third highest charting K-pop album, and also the highest charting K-pop album by a Korean soloist on the Billboard 200 chart by debuting at #112, #1 on Billboard World Albums Chart, and #1 on Heatseekers Albums Chart. The album also debuted at number one on the Gaon Album Chart.

Background and composition 

"Ringa Linga" was the first single for the album, released in November 2013. The track is a hip-hop and EDM song with rhythmic rapping. The album, however, was only released six months after this single with a more R&B sound, with Taeyang saying there was a change in concept during the recording sections because his label, YG, wasn't satisfied with the tracks he was working on.

Taeyang worked with Choice37 and Teddy Park, who had helped with his previous album. He also sought help from Ricky "Shockbit" Luna, The Fliptones, JHart and other noticeable producers, including Boys Noize and Peejay. Both of them had contributed to BigBang albums before. Bandmate G-Dragon also contributed. This album marked the first collaboration between him and Airplay, Jo Sung Hwak, Happy Perez, Britt Burton and other uncredited producers and musicians. Although most tracks are R&B, "Body" is an "old-school disco" with "heavy electronic and digital vibe to it" while "This Ain' It" is reminiscent of British pop, "Let Go" of gospel music and "Intro (Rise)" includes tropical elements.

Release 

The album was digitally released on June 3, consisting of 9 songs and was released worldwide through iTunes, Melon and other online music portals. The physical album hit stores on June 10. There are two different versions of the album. The regular album contains a booklet (48p), CD, one poster, and one sticker. The limited edition features a booklet (128p), CD, two posters, and three photo cards.

Promotion 

On May 25, YG Entertainment revealed the first teaser picture. On the next day, the second teaser photo  was unveiled, followed by a video teaser. The tracklist was revealed on May 28. Ahead of the online release of his new album, Taeyang held a private event, called "Rise:Premiere" in Gangnam with invited reporters and selected fans. There, the new songs and music videos were revealed for the first time.

Taeyang performed "1AM" on several stages during late 2013 including SBS Gayo Daejun. Taeyang's first stage comeback  was on Inkigayo on June 6, 2014. G-Dragon joined him for "Stay With Me" and Taeyang continued to perform alone the title track "Eyes, Nose, Lips." His second comeback stage which was on M! Countdown, where he sang "1AM" and "Eyes, Nose, Lips". He also performed "Eyes, Nose, Lips" and "Ringa Linga" at the talk show You Hee-yeol's Sketchbook. Taeyang met with fans at the Gangnam's JBK Hall for 1theK’s "Wonder Live" show, where he performed "Body" and "Love You to Death" for the first time. On June 27, Taeyang held an unofficial hug event in U-Plex in Shinchon, inviting 200 fans to thank them for showing support for Rise.

On June 15, YG Entertainment announced a "cover project" in which its artists will be covering songs from others. Akdong Musician were the first to release a cover of "Eyes, Nose, Lips." Tablo covered the song with a rap version and Taeyang appeared during its bridge part. Lydia Paek was the third YG Family artist to cover the song for the project.

Critical reception
Fred Thomas from AllMusic said that the album employs "the same K-Pop ear candy production and radio-friendly beats that made both his solo debut and his work in Big Bang so catchy and bright." Jeff Benjamin and Tina Xu from Fuse called Rise "excellent" and highlighted the track "Love You to Death," calling it "stunning." Billboard ranked Rise the sixth best K-Pop album of 2014, claiming the record "is the shining example of how to make a good R&B album today." The radio station 923amp also included Rise in their best K-Pop albums of the year list. While including the record in a list of K-Pop albums for "people who don't like K-Pop," Tamar Herman from Paste said that "Taeyang's crisp, swoon-invoking vocals and the outstanding composition of the songs on Rise will make even the most discerning music listener take a moment or two to stop and abandon previous misconceptions about K-pop."

Track listing 

Notes
"Intro (RISE)" contains samples of Everybody Wants to Rule the World by Tears for Fears
"Body" and "Love You to Death" contain uncredited vocals from 2NE1's CL.
 The female lyrics for "Love You to Death" were written by Kang Hye-Jung

Charts

Sales

References 

2014 albums
Taeyang albums
YG Entertainment albums
Korean-language albums
Albums produced by G-Dragon
Albums produced by Teddy Park